Leadmine Run is a stream in the U.S. state of West Virginia.

Leadmine Run was so named from an incident when an Indian discovered lead ore near the stream, according to local history.

See also
List of rivers of West Virginia

References

Rivers of Preston County, West Virginia
Rivers of Tucker County, West Virginia
Rivers of West Virginia